Papozze is a comune (municipality) in the Province of Rovigo in the Italian region Veneto, located about  southwest of Venice and about  southeast of Rovigo.

Papozze borders the following municipalities: Adria, Ariano nel Polesine, Berra, Corbola, Villanova Marchesana.

References

External links 

Official website 

Cities and towns in Veneto